San Gabriel Valley Airport (formerly El Monte Airport)  is a public airport  north of El Monte, in Los Angeles County, California, United States. In November 2014, its name was changed from El Monte Airport to San Gabriel Valley Airport.

The Federal Aviation Administration (FAA) National Plan of Integrated Airport Systems for 2019–2023 categorized it as a regional reliever general aviation facility.

Facilities

In 2018 the airport had 89,307 aircraft operations, average 245 per day: >99% general aviation, <1% air taxi, and <1% military. In June 2020, 104 aircraft were based at this airport: 96 single-engine, 17 multi-engine, and 5 helicopter.

References

External links 

Airports in Los Angeles County, California
El Monte, California